(born December 30, 1968) is a former baseball player based in Japan. He played for the Fukuoka Daiei Hawks in the Japan Pacific League.

References

Living people
1968 births
Baseball people from Okayama Prefecture
Japanese baseball players
Nippon Professional Baseball catchers
Fukuoka Daiei Hawks players